The Weslake A80 is a  liquid cooled, two-stroke, opposed piston, 1332cc diesel aircraft engine, produced by Weslake.

Design and development
This opposed piston aero-engine appears superficially similar to a true flat-four "boxer" engine, but is actually significantly different. It has two ported cylinders with a crankshaft at each end and four pistons in total. This engine is similar to the prototype Diesel Air engine, which was built for Diesel Air by Weslake, but which has to date failed to reach volume production.

Each crankshaft is linked by an idler gear to a centre shaft.

Applications
none to date

Specifications
Reference: Coulson

See also

References

External links
 

Two-stroke diesel engines
Aircraft diesel engines
Opposed piston engines